Oxelytrum is a genus of burying beetles or carrion beetles belonging to the family Silphidae.

Species in this genus have three ridges on each elytron, without hairs on the pronotal disk. 
They are usually black with reddish markings and have 3-segmented antennal clubs. Most species are nocturnal and are mainly confined to South America.

Species
 Oxelytrum anticola (Guerin-Meneville)
 Oxelytrum apicale (Brullé)
 Oxelytrum biguttatum (Philippi, 1850) 
 Oxelytrum cayennense (Stürm, 1826)
 Oxelytrum discicolle (Brullé, 1836) 
 Oxelytrum emarginatum (Portevin)
 Oxelytrum erythrurum (Blanchard, 1849) 
 Oxelytrum lineatocolle (Laporte)
 Oxelytrum selknan Oliva, 2012

References

Silphidae